Nemacheilus kaimurensis is a species of ray-finned fish in the genus Nemacheilus.

Footnotes 
 

K
Fish described in 1998